Coptoclavella is an extinct genus of beetles in the family Coptoclavidae. There are about seven described species in Coptoclavella.

Species
These seven species belong to the genus Coptoclavella:
 † Coptoclavella elegans Ponomarenko, 1980
 † Coptoclavella inexpecta Soriano & al., 2007
 † Coptoclavella jurassica Ponomarenko, 2014
 † Coptoclavella minor Ponomarenko, 1980
 † Coptoclavella purbeckensis Ponomarenko & al., 2005
 † Coptoclavella striata Ponomarenko, 1986
 † Coptoclavella vittata Ponomarenko, 1986

References

Coptoclavidae
Adephaga genera
Prehistoric beetle genera